Branko Miljković (Serbian Cyrillic: Бранко Миљковић; 29 January 1934 – 12 February 1961) was a Serbian poet.

Biography
Miljković was born in Niš to a Serb father Gligorije Miljković, who hails from Gadžin Han, and a Croat mother Marija Brailo, who hails from Trbounje near Drniš.

He was best known throughout Yugoslavia, the Soviet Union and other countries of the Eastern Bloc for his influential writings. At a time when no one could have foreseen anything but a bright future for the poet, he died prematurely in 1961 at the age of 27. He was found hanging from a tree in Zagreb, today's Croatia. This controversial incident was officially recorded as a suicide.

In his one-line poem "Epitaph", he writes "Ubi me prejaka reč" ("I was killed by a word too strong") almost sensing his premature end of life. During the last years of his life, he published five books of poetry (I Wake Her in Vain, Death against Death, The Origin of Hope, Fire and Nothing, The Shining Blood, criticism, and translations of the French Symbolists and Russian poet Osip Mandelstam. He continues to influence poets to this day.

Legacy
A biopic about Miljković's life and poetry Vatra i ništa ('Fire and Nothing') was produced in 1995.
Goran Milev played the role of Branko Miljković.

He is sometimes called "the Serbian prince of poetry".

Works
 Uzalud je budim, Belgrade, 1957
 Smrću protiv smrti, (co-written with Blažo Šćepanović), Belgrade, 1959
 Vatra i ništa, Belgrade, 1960
 Poreklo nade, Zagreb, 1960
 Krv koja svetli, Belgrade, 1961

References

External links
 Translated works by Branko Miljković
 Biography of Branko Miljković on web site Poetabg 
 Short biography written by Kosta Dimitrijević and published on Poemhunter website
 Short biography on Znanje 
 Works 

1934 births
1961 suicides
Serbian people of Croatian descent
Writers from Niš
20th-century Serbian poets
Serbian male poets
Suicides by hanging in Yugoslavia
Suicides by hanging in Croatia
Death conspiracy theories
University of Belgrade Faculty of Philosophy alumni
Burials at Belgrade New Cemetery
1961 deaths